Yongyouth Sangkagowit (born 4 October 1941) is a Thai former footballer who competed in the 1968 Summer Olympics.

References

External links
 

1941 births
Living people
Yongyouth Sangkagowit
Yongyouth Sangkagowit
Footballers at the 1968 Summer Olympics
Association football defenders
Yongyouth Sangkagowit